Empire State Numismatic Association is a statewide non profit corporation composed of clubs and individuals dedicated to the encouragement of the science of numismatics in New York.

Member Organizations 
Rochester Numismatic Association

External links

 The Official Web Site of the Empire State Numismatic Association
 Tim Corio's collection of ESNA convention badges

Numismatic associations